Lasimorpha is a monotypic genus of flowering plants in the family Araceae. The single species that makes up the genus is Lasimorpha senegalensis. This species is native to western and central Africa, from Liberia east to Chad and south to Angola.

References

External links
 

Lasioideae
Monotypic Araceae genera
Flora of Africa